Somerset Struben de Chair (22 August 1911 – 5 January 1995) was an English author, politician, and poet. He edited several volumes of the memoirs of Napoleon.

Early and personal life
De Chair was the younger son of Admiral Sir Dudley Rawson Stratford de Chair, KCB, KCMG, MVO, and Enid, daughter of Henry William Struben, of Transvaal, South Africa. The de Chair family were of Huguenot origin, descending from Rene de la Chaire, whose grandson, Jean Francois, Councillor to Charles IX, was created a Marquis in 1600 by Henry IV. The family became English gentry through generations of clergymen. He married firstly, on 8 October 1932, Thelma Grace (1911–1974), daughter of Harold Dennison Arbuthnot, of Merristwood Hall, Worplesdon, Surrey. They had two sons: Rodney Somerset and Peter Dudley, and divorced in 1950.

He married secondly, in 1957, Mrs (June) Carmen Appleton, daughter of A. G. Bowen, of Brabourne, Kent. They had two sons: Rory and Somerset Carlo, and divorced in 1957. In 1958 de Chair married his third wife, Mrs Margaret Patricia Manlove, daughter of K. E. Field-Hart; they had a daughter, Teresa Loraine Aphrodite (who married Sir Toby Clarke, 6th Baronet). The third marriage ended in divorce in 1974, and that year he married his fourth wife, Lady Juliet Wentworth-Fitzwilliam, only child of Peter Wentworth-Fitzwilliam, 8th Earl Fitzwilliam, who had divorced Victor Hervey, 6th Marquess of Bristol in 1972. Somerset and Lady Juliet had a daughter, Helena, who married Jacob Rees-Mogg. The hurdler Sir Charles Lawrence Somerset Clarke, 7th Baronet is his grandson and the Member of Parliament Theo Clarke is his granddaughter.

Career
Somerset de Chair was educated at The King's School, Parramatta in New South Wales between 1923 and 1930 before attending Balliol College, Oxford.

He was Conservative MP for South West Norfolk between 1935 and 1945, losing his seat by 53 votes. He was one of the Conservatives who voted against the government in the Norway Debate in May 1940. He then served as a Parliamentary Private Secretary in 1942–44. De Chair returned to Parliament as MP for Paddington South from 1950 to 1951.

Since he had been a cadet in the Officers' Training Corps at Oxford, De Chair qualified for a commission as a Reserve Second Lieutenant of the Life Guards in 1938. He was mobilised on 24 August 1939, a few days before the United Kingdom's entry into World War II. He served as an intelligence officer with the 4th Cavalry Brigade during the Anglo-Iraqi War and the Syrian Campaign where he was wounded on 21 June 1941. Later service was with the General Staff with the rank of Acting Captain.

Writings
De Chair wrote historical non-fiction, a number of now largely neglected novels, one play, three collections of poetry, and several works of autobiography. He also edited several volumes of the memoirs of Napoleon in English.

Houses and art
De Chair was known for his extravagant taste and lived in a series of large country houses. He lived between 1944 and 1949 at Chilham Castle and leased Blickling Hall from the Marquess of Lothian. He owned St Osyth's Priory in Essex from 1954 until his death in 1995, and also bought Bourne Park House in Kent with his last wife, Lady Juliet Wentworth-Fitzwilliam.

Bibliography

Fiction
Enter Napoleon (1934)
Red Tie in the Morning (1936)
The Teetotalitarian State (1947)
The Dome of the Rock (1948)
The Story of a Lifetime (1954)
Bring Back the Gods (1962)
Friends, Romans, Concubines (1973)
The Star of the Wind (1974)
Legend of the Yellow River (1979)

Non-fiction
The Impending Storm (1930)
Divided Europe (1931)
The Golden Carpet (1943)
The Silver Crescent (1943)
Mind on the March (1945)

Edited and translated 
The First Crusade (1945)
Napoleon's Memoirs (1945)
Napoleon's Supper at Beaucaire (1945)
Julius Caesar's Commentaries (1951)
Napoleon on Napoleon (1991)

Edited
The Sea is Strong (1961)
Getty on Getty (1989)

Autobiographies
Buried Pleasure (1985)
Morning Glory (1988)
Die? I Thought I'd Laugh (1993)

Drama
Peter Public (1932)

Poetry collections
The Millennium (1949)
Collected Verse (1970)
Sounds of Summer (1992)

References
 

everything2.com

External links

1911 births
1995 deaths
20th-century British dramatists and playwrights
20th-century English poets
20th-century English novelists
Alumni of Balliol College, Oxford
British Army personnel of World War II
Conservative Party (UK) MPs for English constituencies
English autobiographers
English translators
French–English translators
People educated at The King's School, Parramatta
Royal Horse Guards officers
UK MPs 1935–1945
UK MPs 1950–1951
20th-century English translators
Somerset